Anthony Cameron (born 19 December  1962), better known as Anthony Red Rose, is a Jamaican singjay.

Biography
Born in St. Mary, Cameron initially recorded under the name Tony Rose, adopting 'Anthony Red Rose' to avoid confusion with Michael Rose, who at the time also performed under the name Tony Rose. He was one of the first artists to record at the studio that King Tubby opened in the mid-1980s, and had a huge hit in Jamaica in 1985 with "Tempo", which followed "Under Mi Fat Thing", another take on the "Sleng Teng" riddim. He continued to have further hit singles in the 1980s and 1990s and released the albums Anthony Red Rose Will Make You Dance in 1986 and Family Man in 1994 on VP Records, as well as split albums with Papa San and King Kong.

In the 1990s he began working as a producer together with Anthony Malvo, setting up the 'How Yu Fi Say Dat' label and working with artists such as Beenie Man, Red Dragon, and Simpleton. As the decade saw the rise of Jungle music, "Tempo" enjoyed a rebirth when it was remixed in Jungle fashion.

Discography
Anthony Red Rose Will Make You Dance (1986), Firehouse
Family Man (1994), VP
Good Friends Better Than Pocket Money (2003), 2B1
My Name Is Red Rose (2008), Red Rose

Split albums
Frontline: Papa San Meets Anthony Red Rose (1986), Weed Beat - with Papa San
King Tubbys Presents Two Big Bull in a One Pen (1986), Firehouse - with King Kong

References

1960s births
Jamaican male singers
Jamaican reggae singers
Living people
People from Saint Mary Parish, Jamaica
VP Records artists